Janette Kennedy Lumsden (born 2 October 1945) is a former women's cricketer for New South Wales and Australia whose playing career ran from 1972 until 1978, becoming an international in 1975. A right-handed batsman, Lumsden scored one century against England on 24 July 1976.

References

External links
 
 Jan Lumsden at southernstars.org.au

1945 births
Australia women Test cricketers
Australia women One Day International cricketers
Sportspeople from Musselburgh
New South Wales Breakers cricketers
Living people
Scottish emigrants to Australia